Dmitriy Alexanin is a Kazakhstani épée fencer, team gold medallist at the 2014 Asian Championships and team bronze medallist at the 2014 Asian Games. Alexanin later went on to win a Gold medal (individual) at the 2018 Asian Games.

Career

Alexanin began fencing in 2002 at the instigation of his mother. His first coach was Igor Yarmolkevich. He was then placed under the responsibility of national épée coach Valery Dimov. He made his international debut in the 2010–11 season at the Legnano World Cup. A year later, he won the bronze at the Trophée Monal.

At the 2012 Summer Olympics he competed in the Men's épée, but was defeated in the first round by Silvio Fernández. He won a team bronze medal with Kazakhstan at the 2013 Summer Universiade. He reached the quarter-finals in the individual event and won a team gold medal at the 2013 Asian Fencing Championships in Shanghai. At the 2013 World Fencing Championships in Budapest he reached again the quarter-finals, where he was defeated by Estonia's Nikolai Novosjolov who eventually won the gold medal. Alexanin finished the 2013–14 season No.25, a career best.

Alexanin studied at the Kazakh Academy of Sports and Tourism. His elder brother Sergey is also a fencer.

References

Living people
1991 births
Sportspeople from Almaty
Kazakhstani male épée fencers
Kazakhstani people of Russian descent
Fencers at the 2012 Summer Olympics
Olympic fencers of Kazakhstan
Fencers at the 2014 Asian Games
Fencers at the 2018 Asian Games
Asian Games gold medalists for Kazakhstan
Asian Games bronze medalists for Kazakhstan
Asian Games medalists in fencing
Medalists at the 2014 Asian Games
Medalists at the 2018 Asian Games
Universiade medalists in fencing
Universiade bronze medalists for Kazakhstan
Medalists at the 2013 Summer Universiade
Left-handed fencers